The following outline is provided as an overview of, and topical guide to, applied physics:

Applied physics – physics intended for a particular technological or practical use. 
It is usually considered as a bridge or a connection between "pure" physics and engineering.

Applied Physics – is the proper name of a journal founded and edited by Helmut K.V. Lotsch in 1972 and published by Springer-Verlag Berlin Heidelberg New York from 1973 on

Topics in Applied Physics – is the proper name of a series of quasi-monographs founded by Helmut K.V. Lotsch and published by Springer-Verlag Berlin Heidelberg New York

Type of things that are applied physics 

Applied physics can be described as all of the following:

 Branch of science
 Branch of physics
 Branch of applied science
 Branch of engineering

Branches of applied physics 
Fields and areas of research include:

Accelerator physics
Acoustics  
Agrophysics
Analog electronics
Astrodynamics
Astrophysics
Ballistics
Biophysics
Communication physics
Computational physics 
Condensed matter physics 
Control theory
Digital electronics
Econophysics 
Experimental physics 
Engineering physics
Fiber optics
Fluid dynamics 
Force microscopy and imaging
Geophysics
Laser physics
Medical physics
Metrological physics
Microfluidics 
Nanotechnology
Nondestructive testing
Nuclear engineering
Nuclear technology
Optics 
Optoelectronics
Petrophysics
Photonics
Photovoltaics
Plasma physics
Quantum electronics
Semiconductor physics and devices
Soil physics
Solid state physics
Space physics
Spintronics
Superconductors
Vehicle dynamics

Applied physics institutions and organizations 
International Union of Pure and Applied Physics
Harvard School of Engineering and Applied Sciences
Applied Physics Laboratory, Johns Hopkins University
National Institute of Physics, University of the Philippines Diliman
Institute of Mathematical Science and Physics, University of the Philippines Los Baños
School of Pure and Applied Physics, Mahatma Gandhi University
Institute of Applied Physics and Computational Mathematics, Beijing, China
Institute of Applied Physics, National Academy of Sciences of Ukraine
School of Pure and Applied Physics, University of KwaZulu-Natal
Department of Applied Physics, University of Karachi
Department of Applied Physics and Materials Science, Northern Arizona University

Applied physics publications

Applied physics journals 
American Institute of Physics
Journal of Applied Physics
Applied Physics Letters
Japan Society of Applied Physics
Japanese Journal of Applied Physics
Applied Physics Express
IOP Publishing
Journal of Physics D: Applied Physics
Springer Berlin Heidelberg New York
Applied Physics
Applied Physics A
Applied Physics B
Topics in Applied Physics

Persons influential in applied physics 

 Nikola Tesla
 Michael Faraday

See also

Engineering physics/Engineering science
 Outline of applied science
 Outline of engineering
 Outline of physics

References

External links 

 Applied physics at Harvard
 Applied physics at Stanford University
 Applied physics at Caltech
 Applied physics at Columbia University
 Sample Plans of Study for the Bachelor of Science (B.S.) in Physics, Applied Option - Oklahoma State University

Applied physics
Applied physics